Hoos is a surname. Notable people with the surname include:

Jan de Witte (bishop), 16th century
Edward Hoos (born 1850), former mayor of Jersey City
Robert John Hoos (born 1876), tax commissioner
Fred Hoos (born 1953), Canadian hockey player
Herbert Hoos (born 1965), German footballer
Steffen Hoos (born 1968), German biathlete

Holger H. Hoos (born 1969), German-Canadian computer scientist
Laurien Hoos (born 1983), Dutch athlete

See also
Hoo (disambiguation)